The Green Dragons, also known simply as "Dragonsi" (The Dragons), are supporters of Slovenian football club Olimpija Ljubljana. They are one of two major football ultras groups in Slovenia, the other being their traditional rivals, the Viole Maribor. They mostly wear green and white symbols and clothing, which are the club's colors.

The name 
The name Green Dragons is connected to the symbol of the Slovenian capital, Ljubljana, which is a green dragon. The image of the dragon is therefore familiar to all the residents of the city and it even appears in bronze form on one of the more famous bridges across the Ljubljanica river, the Dragon Bridge. However, the name Green Dragons was first used during a football game against FC Prishtina in the autumn of 1988.

References

External links
Green Dragons official website 
Official Twitter profile

Ultras groups
1988 establishments in Yugoslavia
NK Olimpija Ljubljana (1945–2005)
NK Olimpija Ljubljana (2005)